This article is a list of Russian Fleet hospital ships inactive, active, and historical. The purpose of a hospital ship is to provide a floating medical treatment facility, historically redundant warships were used in this role, though in modern navies, ships may be purpose-built for the role.

Great Northern War (1700–1721)
Perl
Sankt Peterburg, frigate, 1712
Straford
Svyatoy Nikolai, 1715-1717

Russo-Swedish War (1741–1743)
Novaya Nadezhda
Riga
Slava Rossii

Seven Years' War (1756–1763)
Shlisselburg
Svyatoy Nikolai
Uriil (Arhangel Uriil)
Urtriya

Russo-Turkish War (1768–74)
Merkuriy
Nansi
Nordshteyn
Panteleymon
Providenciya

Russo-Swedish War (1788–90)
Chayka
Gus'
Kholmogory
Turukhtan

Crimean War (1853–1856)
Chesma, frigate
Kagul, frigate
Mariya, ship of the line
Midiya, frigate
Rostislav, ship of the line
Yagudiil, frigate

Russo-Turkish War (1877–1878)
Imperatritsa Mariya
Imperator Aleksandr

Boxer Rebellion (1899–1901)
Tsaritsa

Russo-Japanese War (1904–1905)
Angara
Kazan
Kostroma
Mongolia
Orel

World War I

Baltic Sea Fleet

Black Sea Fleet

See also
 Hospital ship
 List of hospital ships sunk in World War I

References
 Зуев Г. И. Госпитальные суда Российского флота в русско-японской войне 1904—1905 гг // Судостроение. — 1996. — N2-3. — С. 60–62.
 Никитин Е.А. Госпитальные суда. — Санкт-Петербург, Судостроение, 1992.
 Никитин Е.А. Суда медицинского назначения. — Москва, Воениздат, 1996.
 Lakhta
 Elberfeld 1889 Tyne Built Ships
 Pallada
 Sinking of Portugal branded as piracy
 Le Portugal

Hospital